Lieutenant Cecil Halliday Abercrombie (12 April 1886 – 31 May 1916) was a rugby union footballer, who represented  and United Services RFC. He was also a first-class cricketer, playing for Hampshire.

Born in Mozufferpore, Indian Empire, Abercrombie was the son of an Indian Police officer. He attended Berkhamsted School and then underwent naval officer training in Dartmouth. Passing out in 1902, he went aboard , joining the British campaign in Somaliland, and was part of the force that captured "Mullah" Hassan's stronghold at Illig in 1904.

He won six caps for Scotland at rugby between 1910 and 1913, scoring a try in the match against  in 1911, which was nevertheless the first victory for the French over any of the Home Nations teams. In cricket, he played 16 matches for Hampshire, scoring 4 centuries, with a high score of 165 runs.

In the First World War, he was aboard  at the Battle of Jutland on 31 May 1916. The ship was struck by German fire, exploded and sank with the loss of all men, including Abercrombie. He is remembered with honour on the Plymouth Naval Memorial.

Early life

Cecil Abercrombie was born on 12 April 1886 in Mozufferpore, Indian Empire, to Walter Abercrombie, an officer in the Indian Police, and Kate Abercrombie. He attended Allan House, Guildford, then Berkhamsted.

Rugby Union career

Cecil Abercrombie played for United Services. He was capped by a 'rest of Scotland' Provinces District side to play against the Cities District side in 1907. He scored a try in the match to give Provinces a 21 -9 win over their rivals.

He played as a forward, and was said to have 'abundant energy... a splendid physique, great speed and height, and a good pair of hands'. He tackled hard and low, and was also an adept place-kicker.

The match was of particular significance for the French, who had never before beaten any of the Home Nations teams. The Scots came out strong, and through the play of the forwards, scored the first try within moments of the start. Soon after, the French scored a converted try, and took the lead, and then a second and third try, putting them 11–3 ahead. Shortly before half time, the ball came out from a maul to Abercrombie, who broke the French defensive line and scored, the conversion bringing the tally to 11–8 to France at the interval. After the break, a dropgoal by Pearson gave Scotland a one-point lead, 11–12, but the French responded with another converted try, taking them ahead, 16–12. With 15 minutes remaining, a Scottish try closed the gap to 16–15. The French were leading and on the verge of winning for the first time when Abercrombie crossed the French try line a second time, but seeking to get nearer the posts, he ran back again over the line and was tackled without having grounded the ball, giving the French a one-point margin of victory.

Abercrombie played a second time against France, at Parc des Princes on 1 January 1913. Ahead of the game, the French press wondered if the victory two years earlier at Colombes was to be repeated. The French scored the first try in the first five minutes, but the Scots scored twice in response and finished the first half leading 3–8. After another Scottish try at the start of the second half, Abercrombie twice attempted to kick a drop goal but was unsuccessful. Then, from a scrum, Abercrombie intercepted the ball from a French attack inside the Scottish half. Unable to run the length of the field, he passed the ball to Gordon, who passed it on to Steward, and he scored the fourth Scottish try. A final try sealed the victory for Scotland, 3–21.

International appearances

Cricket career

Abercrombie was a right-handed batsman and right arm medium pace bowler. He played for Hampshire County Cricket Club in 1913. He scored 126 in his debut innings against Oxford University. His overall batting record in 16 matches included four centuries and two half centuries, and his highest tally was 165 runs against Essex, averaging over 40. He also played for the Army and Navy in 1910, against a combined Oxford and Cambridge Varsity XI, and for the Royal Navy, against the Army, in 1912 and 1913.

Military career

On leaving school, Abercrombie joined the Royal Navy, undergoing officer training at Britannia Royal Naval College, Dartmouth. Both at Berkahmstead and Britannia, he excelled in cricket and rugby, playing in the first XI and XV for both. At Britannia he won in the high jump, long jump, racquets, fives, and swimming.

Passing out of Britannia in 1902, Abercrombie was in January 1903 posted as naval cadet to the cruiser HMS Highflyer, serving on the East Indies Station. He later served aboard . In April 1904, under the command of Captain (later Rear Admiral) Horace Hood, he was in the landing party which captured "Mullah" Hassan's stronghold at Illig, on the east coast of Somaliland (present day Somalia), part of the protracted Somaliland Campaign of 1900 to 1920. Abercrombie's service earned him the Africa General Service Medal with clasp.

At the outbreak of the First World War, Abercrombie was on the Mediterranean station, returning to the UK early in 1916. At the Battle of Jutland on 31 May 1916, he was aboard , the flagship of Rear Admiral Sir Robert Arbuthnot. Defence drew fire from several enemy vessels, away from the main battle fleet: the ship's magazines were hit and exploded, and the ship sank with the loss of all men, including Abercrombie.

Abercrombie is remembered with honour on the Plymouth Naval Memorial.

Family

He left behind a widow, Cecily Joan Abercrombie, née Baker. She was the third daughter of Mr and Mrs Conyers Baker, of 22 Cottesmore Gardens, Kensington, London, and they were married on 29 April 1913.

See also
 List of cricket and rugby union players
 List of international rugby union players killed in action during the First World War

Notes

References

Bibliography

External links
 
 
 

1886 births
1916 deaths
English cricketers
Hampshire cricketers
Royal Navy cricketers
Scottish rugby union players
Scotland international rugby union players
Royal Navy officers of World War I
Royal Navy officers
British military personnel killed in World War I
Deaths due to shipwreck at sea
Army and Navy cricketers
United Services players
Provinces District (rugby union) players
British military personnel of the Fourth Somaliland Expedition
Rugby union forwards